{{Infobox radio station
| name             = KWWJ
| logo             = KWWJ logo.gif
| city             = Baytown, Texas
| area             = Greater Houston
| branding         = Gospel 1360 KWWJ
| airdate          = 
| frequency        = 
| translator       =
| format           = Urban contemporary gospel
| language         = English
| power            = 5,000 watts day1,000 Watts night
| class            = B
| facility_id      = 58724
| coordinates      = 
| callsign_meaning = Keep Walking With Jesus (station slogan)
| former_callsigns = KREL (1948-1959) KWBA (1959-1974) KBUK (1974-1988)
| owner            = Salt of the Earth Broadcasting (Darrell Martin interests)
| webcast          = Listen live
| website          = 
| affiliations     = 
}}

KWWJ (1360 AM) is a commercial radio station licensed to Baytown, Texas, and serving Greater Houston.  It airs an urban contemporary gospel radio format, and is owned by Salt of the Earth Broadcasting.  The station is branded as Gospel 1360 KWWJ''.

By day, KWWJ transmits with 5,000 watts, but to protect other stations on AM 1360, it reduces power to 1,000 watts at night.  It also has a construction permit from the Federal Communications Commission to change its nighttime power to 800 watts.  The transmitter and studios are on Wade Road and Decker Road (Loop 330) in Baytown.

History
In October 1947, the station signed on as KREL.  It was owned by Tri-Cities Broadcasting.  The studio building, transmitter building, and three-tower array for "'Gospel 1360 KWWJ"' are all original to the 1360 facility.

San Diego radio investor Jack O. Gross owned the station as KBUK in the 1970s and early 1980s. His estate sold it after his death in 1985.

In 1988, the station was acquired by current owner Salt of The Earth Broadcasting.  In 2017, KWWJ began broadcasting on its FM translator at 96.9 MHz.  On March 3, 2018, 1360 celebrated its 70th year of operation from the original location on Decker Rd. & Loop 330 in Baytown, Texas.

References

External links
 

Radio stations established in 1984
Gospel radio stations in the United States
WWJ